"Sinu" is a song by the Iban rock band Masterpiece. It was released in 2009 as the lead single from their first studio album, Merindang Ke Bintang. "Sinu" was Masterpiece's major single which helped to place them in the Sarawak music scene and the song has been recognized as one of Masterpiece's signature songs and has been covered on numerous occasions and shows. It was produced by Embat Lala, who produced the entire album under his record label, Panggau Buluh Pengerindu Records. "Sinu" has won the "Best Song" awards at the Anugerah Carta Rentak Ruai AJARR awards ceremony, represented by Cats FM on 21 May 2011 in Kuching, Sarawak.

Track listing
 "Sinu" (Album Version) - 4:38

Music video
The music video (directed by Harry Frederick) were filmed in Beach Club Sibu features the band performing on a stage.

References

External links
 Lyrics of this song on Lirik Lagu Iban
 Guitar chord of this song on Ultimate guitar

2008 songs
Rock ballads
Masterpiece (band) songs
2009 singles